Veenhuizen (West Frisian: Fenenhúze) is a village in the Dutch province of North Holland. It is located in the former municipality of Heerhugowaard, about 6 km northeast of Heerhugowaard itself.

Veenhuizen was a separate municipality from 1817 to 1854, when it was merged with Heerhugowaard.

It is not a statistical entity. and the postal authorities have placed it under Heerhugowaard. It consists of about 160 houses.

Since 2022 it has been part of the new municipality of Dijk en Waard.

Gallery

References

Former municipalities of North Holland
Populated places in North Holland
Geography of Dijk en Waard